Achterste Erm is a hamlet in the Netherlands, it is part of the Coevorden municipality in Drenthe. 

Achterste Erm is a statistical entity, but the postal authorities have placed it under Erm. It was first mentioned in 1936 as Achterste-Erm, and means "the furthers part of Erm".

See also
 Erm, Netherlands

References

Coevorden
Populated places in Drenthe